Calvadosia corbini is a stalked jellyfish species in the family Kishinouyeidae from the tropical western Atlantic.  The species is named after Peter Corbin, a marine biologist noted for his extensive work on Atlantic Stauromedusae.

References

External links

 Kishinouyea corbini on Catalogue Of Life : 2009 Annual Checklist
 Kishinouyea_corbini entry on WoRMS

Kishinouyeidae
Animals described in 1980